The Indo-Aryan language spoken on the Pothohar Plateau in the far north of Pakistani Punjab, as well as in most of Pakistan's Azad Kashmir and in western areas of India's Jammu and Kashmir, is known by a variety of names, the most common of which are Pahari (an ambiguous name also applied to unrelated languages of India), and Pothwari (or Pothohari).

The language is transitional between Hindko and Standard Punjabi and is mutually intelligible with both. There have been efforts at cultivation as a literary language, although a local standard has not been established yet. The Shahmukhi script is used to write the language, such as in the works of Mian Muhammad Bakhsh.

Grierson in his early 20th-century Linguistic Survey of India assigned it to a so-called "Northern cluster" of Lahnda (Western Punjabi), but this classification, as well as the validity of the Lahnda grouping in this case, have been called into question.

Geographic distribution and dialects 

There are at least three major dialects: Pothwari, Mirpuri and Pahari. The Pothwari spoken in Gujar Khan is regarded as the most prestigious dialect of Pothwari spoken in Pakistan.

The dialects are mutually intelligible, but the difference between the northernmost and the southernmost dialects (from Muzaffarabad and Mirpur respectively) is enough to cause difficulties in understanding.

Pothohar Plateau
Pothwari, also spelt Potwari, Potohari and Pothohari, is spoken in the Pothohar Plateau of northern Punjab, an area administratively within Rawalpindi division. Pothwari is its most common name, and some call it Pindiwal Punjabi to differentiate it from the Punjabi spoken elsewhere in Punjab.

Pothwari extends southwards up to the Salt Range, with the city of Jhelum marking the border with Punjabi. To the north, Pothwari transitions into the Pahari-speaking area, with Bharakao, near Islamabad, generally regarded as the point where Pothwari ends and Pahari begins. Pothwari has been represented as a dialect of Punjabi by the Punjabi language movement,  and in census reports the Pothwari areas of Punjab have been shown as Punjabi-majority.

Mirpur
East of the Pothwari areas, across the Jhelum River into Mirpur District in Azad Kashmir, the language is more similar to Pothwari than to the Pahari spoken in the rest of Azad Kashmir.
Locally it is known by a variety of names: Pahari, Mirpur Pahari, Mirpuri, and Pothwari, while some of its speakers call it Punjabi.
Mirpuris possess a strong sense of Kashmiri identity that overrides linguistic identification with closely related groups outside Azad Kashmir.
The Mirpur region has been the source of the greater part of Pakistani immigration to the UK, a process that started when thousands were displaced by the construction of the Mangla Dam in the 1960s and emigrated to fill labour shortages in England.
The British Mirpuri diaspora now numbers several hundred thousand, and Pahari has been argued to be the second most common mother tongue in the UK, yet the language is little known in the wider society there and its status has remained surrounded by confusion.

Kashmir, Murree and the Galyat
Pahari is spoken to the north of Pothwari. The central cluster of Pahari dialects is found around Murree. This area is in the Galyat: the hill country of Murree Tehsil in the northeast of Rawalpindi District (just north of the capital Islamabad) and the adjoining areas in southeastern Abbottabad District. One name occasionally found in the literature for this language is Dhundi-Kairali (Ḍhūṇḍī-Kaiṛālī), a term first used by Grierson who based it on the names of the two major tribes of the area – the Kairal and the Dhund. Its speakers call it Pahari in Murree tehsil, while in Abbotabad district it is known as either Hindko or Ḍhūṇḍī.
Nevertheless, Hindko – properly the language of the rest of Abbottabad District and the neighbouring areas of Khyber Pakhtunkhwa  – is generally regarded as a different language. It forms a dialect continuum with Pahari,  and the transition between the two is in northern Azad Kashmir and in the Galyat region. For example, on the road from Murree northwest towards the city of Abbottabad, Pahari gradually changes into Hindko between Ayubia and Nathiagali.

A closely related dialect is spoken across the Jhelum River in Azad Kashmir, north of the Mirpuri areas. Names associated in the literature with this dialect are Pahari (itself the term most commonly used by the speakers themselves), Chibhālī, named after the Chibhal region or the Chibh ethnic group, and Poonchi (also spelt Punchhi). The latter name has been variously applied to either the Chibhali variety specific to the district of Poonch, or to the dialect of the whole northern half of Azad Kashmir. 
This dialect (or dialects) has been seen either as a separate dialect from the one in Murree, or as belonging to the same central group of Pahari dialects. The dialect of the district of Bagh, for example, has more shared vocabulary with the core dialects from Murree (86–88%) than with the varieties of either Muzaffarabad (84%) or Mirpur (78%).

In Muzaffarabad the dialect shows lexical similarity of 83–88% with the central group of Pahari dialects, which is high enough for the authors of the sociolinguistic survey to classify it is a central dialect itself, but low enough to warrant noting its borderline status. The speakers however tend to call their language Hindko and to identify more with the Hindko spoken to the west, despite the lower lexical similarity (73–79%) with the core Hindko dialects of Abbottabad and Mansehra. Further north into the Neelam Valley the dialect, now known locally as Parmi, becomes closer to Hindko.

Pahari is also spoken further east across the Line of Control into the Pir Panjal mountains in Indian Jammu and Kashmir. The population, estimated at 1 million, is found in the region between the Jhelum and Chenab rivers: most significantly in the districts of Poonch and Rajouri, to a lesser extent in neighbouring Baramulla and Kupwara, and also – as a result of the influx of refugees during the Partition of 1947 – scattered throughout the rest of Jammu and Kashmir. Pahari is among the regional languages listed in the sixth schedule of the Constitution of Jammu and Kashmir. This Pahari is sometimes conflated with the Western Pahari languages spoken in the mountainous region in the south-east of Indian Jammu and Kashmir. These languages, which include Bhadarwahi and its neighbours, are often called "Pahari", but they are not closely related to Pahari–Pothwari.

Phonology

Vowels 

Consonants 

 Sounds  are heard from Persian and Arabic loanwords.
  is realized as voiced  in word-initial position.

Comparison with Punjabi

Use of Sī-endings for Future Tense

Tribal groupings 
Pahari-Pothwari speakers belong to the same tribes found in Punjab. While the names of the tribes remain the same, the Punjabi word for tribe Birādrī/Barādarī (برادری) becomes Bilādrī/Balādarī (بل ادری) in Pahari-Pothwari.

Numbering system 
Pahari-Pothwari follows the numbering traditions of Punjabi. A clear point of departure from Eastern Punjabi dialects occurs in the use of treah (ترے) instead of tinn (تِن) for the number 3. Western Punjabi as well as Doabi also tend to use treah (ترے) instead of tinn (تِن).

Ordinals

The ordinal numbers are largely the same. The only difference occurs in the words for Second and Third. Second is Doowa (دووا) in Pothwari, whilst it is Dooja (دوجا) in Punjabi. Likewise Third is Treeya (تریا) in Pothwari whilst it is Teeja (تیجا) in Punjabi. Western punjabi in general tends to follow this trend.

Object Marker 
The object marker in Pothwari is kī (ਕੀ /کی) as opposed to nū̃ (ਨੂੰ / نوں) in Punjabi.

For example:

The phrase: lokā̃ kī (ਲੋਕਾਂ ਕੀ / لوکاں کی), meaning "to the people" in Standard Punjabi, would become lokā̃ nū̃ (ਲੋਕਾਂ ਨੂੰ / لوکاں نوں).

Genitive Marker 
The Genitive marker in Pothwari is represented through the use of nā (ਨਾ / ) as opposed to dā (ਦਾ / ).

For example:

The phrase: lokā̃ dā (ਲੋਕਾਂ ਦਾ / ), meaning "people's" or "of the people" in Pothwari, would become lokā̃ nā (ਲੋਕਾਂ ਨਾ / ).

The word for 'my' becomes māhaṛā (ਮਾਹੜਾ / ماہڑا; m.) instead of māhaṛī (ਮਾਹੜੀ / ماہڑی; f.).

Vocabulary 
Very clear point of departure occurs in the use of achṇā (ਅੱਛਣਾ /  'to come') and gachṇā (ਗੱਛਣਾ /  'to go') as opposed to Saraiki āvaṇ (ਆਵਣ / ) and vañjaṇ (ਵੰਞਣ / ), and Punjabi āuṇā (ਆਉਣਾ / ) and jāṇā (ਜਾਣਾ / ).

Notes

References

Bibliography 

 (access limited).

Further reading

External links
 Pahari Language Textbook for Class2
 Pahari Language Textbook for Class3
 Pahari Language Textbook for Class4
 Pahari Language Textbook for Class5
 Pahari Language Textbook for Class6
 Pahari Language Textbook for Class8 (Part A)
 Pahari Language Textbook for Class8 (Part B)

Punjabi dialects
Languages of Punjab, Pakistan
Languages of Azad Kashmir
Languages of Jammu and Kashmir